Letovice is a town in Blansko District in the South Moravian Region of the Czech Republic. It has about 6,700 inhabitants.

Administrative parts
The town part of Třebětín and villages of Babolky, Chlum, Dolní Smržov, Jasinov, Kladoruby, Klevetov, Kněževísko, Kochov, Lhota, Meziříčko, Novičí, Podolí, Slatinka, Zábludov and Zboněk are administrative parts of Letovice.

Geography
It lies mostly in the Boskovice Furrow. The town is situated in the valley of the Svitava River, at its confluence with the Křetínka River. West of the town on the Křetínka, there is the Letovice Reservoir.

History
The first written mention of Letovice is from 1145.

Demographics

Sights
The landmark of the town is the Letovice Castle. The original castle from the 13th century was rebuilt into an early Baroque residence at the end of the 17th century. Today the castle is privately owned and gradually repaired with the aim of making it available to the public.

Notable people
Count Gustav Kálnoky (1832–1898), Austro-Hungarian diplomat and statesman
Alois Biach (1849–1918), Austrian physician and medical writer
Emanuel Löffler (1901–1986), gymnast

Twin towns – sister cities

Letovice is twinned with:
 Chełmno, Poland
 Kirchlinteln, Germany
 Kőbánya (Budapest), Hungary
 Slepčany, Slovakia
 Stari Grad, Croatia

References

External links

Cities and towns in the Czech Republic
Populated places in Blansko District